The Dicyemidae is a family of tiny parasites that live in the renal appendages of cephalopods. It contains the following genera and species:
 Dicyema von Kolliker, 1849
 Dicyemennea Whitman, 1883
 Dicyemodeca 
 Dicyemodeca anthinocephalum Furuya, 1999 - parasitizes Octopus dofleini 
 Dicyemodeca deca (McConnaughey, 1957)
 Dicyemodeca dogieli Bogolepova, 1957
 Dodecadicyema Kalavati & Narasimhamurti, 1979
 Dodecadicyema loligoi Kalavati & Narasimhamurti, 1980
 Pleodicyema 
 Pleodicyema delamarei Nouvel, 1961
 Pseudicyema Nouvel, 1933
 Pseudicyema cappacephalum Furuya, 2009
 Pseudicyema nakaoi Furuya, 1999 - parasitizes Sepia lycidas and Sepia esculenta 
 Pseudicyema truncatum'' (Whitman, 1883)

References

Parasites of molluscs
Parasitic protostomes
Lophotrochozoa families
Dicyemida